The 1999 Ebonyi State House of Assembly election was held on January 9, 1999, to elect members of the Ebonyi State House of Assembly in Nigeria. All the 24 seats were up for election in the Ebonyi State House of Assembly.

Results

Izzi West 
APP candidate Ngwuta Joseph won the election.

Onicha East 
APP candidate Patrick Ebediegwu won the election.

Ezza North West 
PDP candidate Mgbada Samuel won the election.

Afikpo North West 
PDP candidate Christopher Omo Isu won the election.

Ebonyi North West 
PDP candidate Kenneth Ochigbo won the election.

Ezza South 
PDP candidate Tobias Okwuru won the election.

Ohaozara West 
APP candidate Anoke Uwadiegwu won the election.

Ezza North East 
PDP candidate Joseph Nwaobasi won the election.

Afikpo South West 
APP candidate Ugorji Ama Oti won the election.

Izzi East 
PDP candidate Simon Iseh won the election.

Abakaliki North 
PDP candidate Fabian Muoneke won the election.

Ikwo North 
PDP candidate David Onuoha won the election.

Ohaukwu South 
PDP candidate Onwe S. Onwe won the election.

Ebonyi North East 
A candidate won the election.

Afikpo South East 
APP candidate Ben Obasi won the election.

Ikwo South 
PDP candidate Festus Okoha won the election.

Ishielu South 
PDP candidate Julius Ucha won the election.

Ivo 
PDP candidate Ray Akanwa won the election.

Ohaozara East 
PDP candidate Sunday Chukwu won the election.

Ohaukwu North 
PDP candidate Uzim Nwankwo won the election.

Onicha West 
PDP candidate Okorie Linus won the election.

Abakaliki South 
AD candidate Fidelis Ogodo won the election.

Ishielu North 
PDP candidate Eze Jonathan won the election.

Afikpo North East 
APP candidate Arinze Egwu won the election.

References 

Ebonyi State elections
Ebonyi
January 1999 events in Nigeria